The Wangara (also known as Wakore, Wankori, Ouankri, Wangarawa, Dyula, Jula, Jakhanke, Jalonke) are a subgroup of the Soninke who later became assimilated (at varying degrees) merchant classes  that specialized in both Trans Saharan and Secret Trade of Gold Dust. Their diaspora operated all throughout West Africa Sahel-Sudan. Fostering regionally organized trade networks and Architecture projects. But based in the many Sahelian and Niger-Volta-Sene-Gambia river city-states. Particularly Dia, Timbuktu, Agadez, Kano, Gao, Koumbi Saleh, Guidimaka, Salaga, Kong, Bussa, Bissa, Kankan, Jallon, Djenné as well as Bambouk, Bure, Lobi, and (to a lesser degree) Bono State goldfields and Borgu. They also were practicing Muslims with a clerical social class (Karamogo), Timbuktu Alumni political advisors, Sufi Mystic healers and individual leaders (Marabout). Living by a philosophy of merchantile pacifism called the Suwarian Tradition. Teaching peaceful coexistence with non-Muslims, reserving Jihad for self-defence only and even serving as Soothsayers or a "priesthood" of literate messengers for non-Muslim Chiefdoms/Kingdoms. This gave them a degree of control and immense wealth in lands where they were the minority. Creating contacts with almost all West African religious denominations. A group of Mande traders, loosely associated with the Kingdoms of the Sahel region and other West African Empires. Such as Ghana, Mali, Songhai, Bono State, Kong, Borgu, Dendi, Macina, Hausa Kingdoms & the Pashalik of Timbuktu. Wangara also describes any land south of Timbuktu and Agadez. The Bilad-Al-Sudan or Bilad-Al-Tibr, "Land of Black" or "Gold."

History & Origin
Peter Bakewell described the Wangara as, "Malians who specialized in the management of long-distance commerce, and the growth of the west African gold trade was closely linked with the extension of the range of their activities. They were the first link in the chain that reached from the producers of gold in West Africa to the consumers in the Mediterranean basin and beyond." Al-Bakri called them "specialist gold traders in the region of the Senegal and Niger rivers." Ibn Battuta described them in 1352 as traders from "west of the interior delta of the Niger." The geographer Muhammad al-Idrisi referred to the Wangara as being from "the land of gold, famous on account of the great quantities and good quality of that metal." The Tarikh al-fattash refers to the Wangara as "one who engages in trade and travels from one horizon to another." Valentim Fernandes mentions the Wangara gold traders operating out of Jenne, controlling the gold trade between Jenne and the Bono State goldfields. They were noted for their honesty and industry.

A Malian source, cited in the Tarikh al-Sudan, distinguishes the Wangara on a socio-professional level from their Malinke kinsmen by claiming the latter to be princes and warriors and the former "traders who carry gold dust from country to country as the courtiers of princes".

Located in the Lakes Region at the eastern end of the "country of Wanqara" was Tiraqqa or Tombouze, a predecessor of Timbuktu. It was one of the great commercial centers of the region—a meeting place of caravans from Ghana and Tadmakka in the 10th and 11th centuries—and a dependency of Ghana. Al-Idrisi describes it as "one of the towns of Wanqara"—large, well populated, and unwalled—and relates that it was "subject to the ruler of Ghana, in litigation."It remained an important mart until the 13th century, at which time Timbuktu replaced it.

Not only were they gold merchants, they exercised a virtual monopoly of the world-system's gold trade. Al-Idrisi describes their land as having "flourishing towns and famous strongholds. Its inhabitants are rich, for they possess gold in abundance, and many good things are imported to them from the outermost parts of the earth... "

They descend from Neolithic Era Bafour people. Black agriculturalist inhabitants of a once fertile Green Sahara. Increased Desertification drove these proto-Soninke, pre-Ghana civilizations southwest where they established stone settlements as early as 3000 B.C.E. (possibly as far back as 4000 B.C.E. or even earlier) at sites Dhar Tichitt/Tichitt; Dhar Walata, and Dhar Néma.

Herodotus the Greek tells of silent trade between Carthage and unspecified regions to its south. Pointing to stories of Punic travelers like Hanno the Navigator. If true, trade with Carthage possibly started as early as the 6th century B.C. Well before the known start of Ghana in 300B.C.-300A.D. It is very possible that the decline of Carthage after the Punic Wars left the Soninke clans cut off & tradeless as Carthage kept their source of African gold secret. (A tradition the Wangara would continue). No matter the historical fact eventually the power vacuum created was filled by Ghana-Berber trade. "The Carthaginians also tell us that they trade with a race of men who live in a part of Libya beyond the Pillars of Hercules. On reaching this country, they unload their goods, arrange them tidily along the beach, and then, returning to their boats, raise a smoke. Seeing the smoke, the natives come down to the beach, place on the ground a certain quantity of gold in exchange for the goods, and go off again to a distance. The Carthaginians then come ashore and take a look at the gold; and if they think it represents a fair price for their wares, they collect it and go away; if, on the other hand, it seems too little, they go back aboard and wait, and the natives come and add to the gold until they are satisfied. There is perfect honesty on both sides; the Carthaginians never touch the gold until it equals in value what they have offered for sale, and the natives never touch the goods until the gold has been taken away."

Gold Trade
Though the Wangarans kept the location a secret to protect their monopoly, the general area of the Akan goldfields was known by the sixteenth century. In his Esmeraldo de Situ Orbis (1505–1508), Duarte Pacheco Pereira described the gold trade in Djenne and Bighu. Abul Qasim ibn Mohammed al-Ghassani in 1586 described Bighu as a place where "mines of gold and gold dust" were found. Sultan Muhammed Bello had an 1824 map with Bono state, Elmina, and Bighu clearly marked.

In ancient Ghana by tradition all gold nuggets belonged to the King, leaving the gold dust for the trade.

It made them rich & loyal. The tradition continued with Ghana being absorbed by the King of Mali Sundiata Keita and again with the Songhai under Askia the Great. Then the Pashalik of Timbuktu. Followed by the Fulani Jihad States. The tradition ended with the colonisation of Africa by Europe.

It was the gold mined in Wangara that paid the tribute demanded from Moriscos by the Spanish crown during the Reconquista. When Europe found a much larger source of gold in the Americas many African states began to decline. Becoming the main importer of slaves instead of gold.

In the closing years of the 18th and the opening years of the 19th century, the discoveries of Friedrich Hornemann, Mungo Park and others revived the stories of Wangara and its richness in gold. Geographers of that period, such as James Rennell, shifted the Wangara country far to the east and confused Idrisi's description with accounts which probably referred to Lake Chad.

Today, many West African gold mines are rife with foreigners, corruption & human rights abuses. Have little oversight and zero trickle down to the people. Essentially dismantling any control of the gold trade Wangarans may have had left.

Expansion
Between the 12th and 14th centuries, the Wangara extended their trade networks eastwards towards the Gao Empire & Lake Chad basin. They also moved several hundred kilometers northwards from Koumbi Saleh where they established agricultural colonies and fortified oasis towns, which served as caravanserai. Earlier travels between the 9th-11th centuries into western Takrur and Futa Jallon took place. As well as the Guinea Highlands and Volta River to the south. Their strategic movements were a response to increased commercial traffic along the trade routes - a consequence of Almoravid and Almohad political and social hegemonies and commercial activity in the Maghreb and Andalusia (9th–15th century) and, in part, an effort to consolidate Ghana's political interests in the southern Sahara. After many years of assimilating with local populations many Wangara communities identified more as a social class of their own than just ethnically Soninke.

Into Yoruba Lands

During the reign of Mansa Musa in the 14th century, the Wangara had traveled farther than ever before and in doing so reached the Yoruba states of southwest Nigeria. There it was called Esin Imale, "Religion of the Malians" or "Hard Knowledge". After a 2nd wave of Songhai speaking Wangara and a 3rd wave by Muslim Fulani, many Yoruba subgroups such as the Ijesa, Oyo, Ilorin, Egba & Ijebu had sizable Muslim communities by the 19th century.

Into the Atlantic Coast

By the 16th Century improved sailing techniques and better ships began to cause the slow decline of the long dominant Trans-Saharan trade. A much longer and dangerous route. This shift in trade from Sahara north to Pepper Coast south caused by the advent of European & Barbary ships began to weaken many African states. The new Trans-Atlantic Slave Trade fueled intertribal rivalries making matter worse. In 1505 A.D. a number of Mali Empire clans called the Mane people migrated from the Niger river to Atlantic coast in a supposed dispute turned exile of a noblewoman named "Mabete Macarico" of the Camara Clan by the Mansa (Emperor) when she addresses his incompetence. By 1570 A.D. the Mane people assimilated all the native inhabitants of modern Sierra Leone & Liberia to varying degrees. Whether it be linguistically, religiously or culturally. It is through here and Senegambia that the Wangara began to acquire firearms and more easily accessible goods.

Into Mossi Lands

Paradoxically, the infiltration of Wangara traders (also known as Marka or Yalsé) into Mossi territory seems to be a result of the Mossi incursions into the Niger valley and the Mandé city of Walata since the early 15th century, which contributed more to the decline of Mali than other factors and which provoked the Songhay usurpation in last consequence.

The Mossi (who were hostile to Islam) in earlier times raided the northern markets for trade goods, especially salt, but later permitted Muslim traders from these areas to import the desired goods into their own country. The survival of the Songhay kingdom in the eastern Gourma following the Moroccan conquest of 1592, could be explained as a consequence of the gradual and peaceful penetration of the Wangara into these eastern regions: Gourma (with Boulsa, Bilanga), Dendi and Borgou.

Into Hausa Lands

The relevant sources, the Kano Chronicle and one used by Ibrahim b. Mhd. n.Idris b.Husai, dated to 1061 (1650/51), mention that the Wangarawa—as many as 160 people—emigrated under the leadership of Shaikh Abderrahman surnamed Za(gha)iti and came to Kano and introduced Islam, according to the first source in Yaji's time (1349–1385), according to the second under Mohamad Rumfa (AH 867–904, 1463–99), after having left Mali in 835 AH (1433 AD).

The surname, derived from "Zagha" or "Zeghai", may point to the town of Zagha (Zare- or Sare-) in the Macina or Lake region south of Timbuktu. These Wangara left during a time of great insecurity due to Mossi incursions and moved to greater Songhay protection, adopted the Songhay language, and perhaps intensified the commercial contacts between Songhay and Hausa. In their eastern migration, it is believed that the Wangara split up in two groups in Gobir, one going to Kano and the other going to the Aïr. There are documented Wangara communities in Kano, Katsina and in the Borgou.

While there, they established "kingship" with royal councils of indigenous priestchiefs from among the members of local lineages. A certain Mohamed Korau, a Wangara, elected in 1492/3, became the first Muslim sarki of Katsina.

Into the Volta Basin

The Volta basin has been important for the Wangara in several respects: it comprised some of the main gold-producing areas (Lobi, Banda) while being linked to others (in the Birim and Pra and Offin river basins, and in Ivory Coast); it marks the southern end of the long-distance trade route from Djenné and Timbuktu - where precious goods from the forest zone (gold, kola) were produced; it also forms the border and link between the Mande-Dyula and Hausa-Zongo linguistic and economic spheres.

In contemporary Ghana, "Wangara" refers to Mande speakers and those believed to be of Mande origin and associated with trade. Whereas the Hausa language is a lingua franca among the Zongo Settlements and Gonja, Dyula is spoken as a lingua franca in Northern Ivory Coast, the South of Burkina Faso and Northwestern Ghana. In Ghana, it is heard from Wa down to Wenchi, due to the close association with the important Islamic centers of Kong and Bouna. Following the familiar complex of "Market-Mosque-Medressa", the Wangara founded the colonies of Begho, Bole (Boualé), Bondoukou and others on the forest fringe, in addition to Kong and Bouna. They also had some success in the conversion of Mossi, Dagbon & Bono people. Macina Fulani also maintained a presence.

Into the Eastern Sudan

While the Wangara themselves were only able to build communities as far east as Kano, Nigeria their nomadic Fulani vassals proved more successful. Especially after the 18th century Jihad States of Imamate of Futa Jallon, Futa Toro, Macina, Sokoto Caliphate and Adamawa. Who would begin to dominate West Africa and use the Wangara trade networks as seen in the cooperation of Futa Jallon with the Jakhanke Soninke subgroup & Macina with the Soninke scholars of Timbuktu. In the Western Sudan the Wangara (aNegro people) had become the primary bringers of Islam. But in the Eastern Sudan the kingdom of Kanem-Bornu and Arab tribes were already long established. Making the possible success of new, permanent settlements difficult. Nilo-Saharan and Chadic groups such as the Kanuri, Tebu, Baguirmi, Mandara and Wadai actively competed in trade. It is through the eastward routes of the Sahel taken by the pastoral Fulani on their Hajj to Mecca that the Wangara undoubtedly benefitted, albeit vicariously. The reason for the use of this alternative route is unknown. Possibly due to increasing desertification of the Sahara making northward travel too dangerous or to avoid being mistaken as a slave by an Arab North Africa that began to perceive blacks as a simple slave class.. An Emperor of Mali, Sakura Keita was said to have taken the old Saharan route to Mecca and for unknown reasons decided to return using the Sahel route. He crossed the Red Sea & arrived in Ethiopia where he was killed by Afar men known to be expert knife fighters. One or more of the 7 sons of Bilal ibn Rabah, the first Muezzin and half black Habesha was said to have arrived in Manding by following the Niger River through this path. Traveling parallel to the Muslim Conquest in the north. Finally settling in Kangaba as Prince and vassal of the Ghana Empire. Which would later combine into the Mali Empire under the rule of the same descendants.

Into the Americas

There are two instances of a Wangara presence in the Americas. One being the possible success of Emperor Abu Bakr II of Mali two voyages across the Atlantic Ocean in the 14th century and the more proven recordings of black Muslim "Moors" in the Trans-Atlantic Slave Trade.

Mansa Musa during his Hajj in Egypt told of his predecessor Abu Bakr II. Who abdicated his throne to explore the ends of the earth to never return. First sending a fleet of 400 ships and then later personally leading another consisting of 2,000. Proof of his success is scarce & any African admixture in modern Native populations would be indistinguishable from slaves brought later by Europeans. Although some Native art with debatably African features in the form of stone structures & tablets. Copper-gold speartips of possible African origin in the Caribbean. Clothing styles similar to Muslim headwear by some early encountered tribes. Even the attestment of Europeans themselves of seeing black Natives darker than the rest. Christopher Columbus himself wrote of his 3rd voyages mission to confirm reports of "canoes of the coast of Africa ready to sail". None have been confirmed but the matter has still been up for debate among historians.

Many slaves in the Trans-Atlantic Slave Trade were black Muslim West Africans already educated and skilled, sometimes more so than their European slavers. The exact number is unknown but ranges from 20% to 30%. Undoubtedly some were participants or at the least had knowledge of the Wangara trade networks as the Muslim slave communities in the Americas were already familiar with each other's existence. This created a subcommunity of slaves that actively sought each other out through the practices of the "Cursed Sect of Mohamet". Though still divided among ethnic & linguistic lines they ultimately united through faith. Said to have little trouble finding ways to communicate and would defiantly practice in secret or convene openly for prayer depending on their overseer. Many still wore clothing akin to their old way such as veils, headwraps, dresses, longsleeve tunics, turbans, harem pants, caps, kufis, conical hats and extra material to sometimes wrap their faces. They were responsible for many organized uprisings such as the Male Revolt and Haitian Revolution. Carrying their traditions among the Gullah as late as the 19th century. They consisted of black Muslim ethnic groups like the Wolof, Serer, Mandingo, Nago, Fulani, Tukulor, Mano, Serecule, Songhai, Zarma, Hausa, Mandara, Gonja Kanuri, Baguirmi, Bamun, Bamileke, Sara, Nupe, Arma Moors, Tuareg, Borgu, Gur and Zongo

Notable Leaders
El-Hajj Mansa "Musa" Kankan Keita of the Keita Dynasty, Descendant of the first Muezzin Bilal Al-Habesha
 Fodiya Mohammed Fodiki Sanou El Wankori, left his country of Bitou as a result of the internal strife and installed himself in Djenné in 1492
 el-Abbas Kibi, Oua'kri of origin, and cadi of Djenné
 Mahmoud-ben-Abou-Bekr-Bagayogo, the father of the lawyers Mohammed and Ahmed Bagayogo, cadi from 1552, and founder of a whole family of "law consultants"
 Mohammed-Benba-Kenâti
 Mohammed-ben-Mahmoud-ben-Abu-Bakr (1524–1593)
M Lamine Drammeh

References

Sources
 Massing, Andrew W. "The Wangara, an Old Soninke Diaspora in West Africa?" Cahiers D'Études Africaines 158 (2000): 281–308. Print.
 Wilks, Ivor. "Wangara." Encyclopedia of Islam. 2nd ed. Vol. XI. N.p.: n.p., 2002. 137–38. Print.

Ethnic groups in Mali
Ethnic groups in Mauritania
History of Mali
History of Burkina Faso
History of Nigeria
History of Niger
Muslim communities in Africa
Soninke people